Erucastrum nasturtiifolium is a species of flowering plant belonging to the family Brassicaceae.

Its native range is Central and Southern Europe.

References

Brassicaceae